The Profit is an American documentary-style reality television show broadcast on CNBC.  In each episode, Marcus Lemonis typically offers a capital investment and his expertise to struggling small businesses in exchange for an ownership stake in the company, but a series of "Inside Look" episodes have commentary by Lemonis and executive producer Amber Mazzola as they watch past episodes. Some episodes simply show a business, city, or industry without any investment by Lemonis. The Partner is a spin-off series that aired in 2017, also featuring Lemonis.

Season 1 premiered on July 30, 2013; season 2 premiered on February 25, 2014. The second part of the second season returned October 2014. After a successful second season, with ratings going up 115% from the first season, the third season premiered on May 12, 2015. The Profit returned for a fourth season on August 23, 2016. A fifth season premiered on November 21, 2017 and started with a "recap" episode that looked back at different companies Lemonis had invested in and said whether they were a "win" or a "loss". The sixth season premiered on December 4, 2018.  On October 14, 2019, it was announced that the seventh season will premiere on November 5, 2019.

On September 28, 2021 Marcus Lemonis posted on his Twitter feed "2013 - 2021  thank you", indicating that season 8 will be the last season for the show.

Production, spin-offs, and specials
Lemonis does not get paid by the production company, Machete Productions, nor do they help fund his investments. Occasional promotions for AT&T, Chase, and LegalZoom have appeared.

A 2017 spin-off, The Partner, featured Lemonis searching for a business partner to help run businesses featured in The Profit.

A special titled "The Profit in Cuba" aired on November 15, 2016; it featured Lemonis travelling to Cuba to explore new business opportunities in the country. It was watched by 478,000 viewers. Other specials looked at Puerto Rico and both the legal and illegal marijuana industries in California. Another special was titled "Top 10 Rules for Success".

On April 3, 2019, it was announced that a 90-minute original documentary titled The Profit: My Roots will air on April 9, 2019.

Episodes

Season 1 (2013)

Season 2 (2014)

Season 3 (2015–16)

Season 4 (2016–17)

Season 5 (2017–18)

Season 6 (2018–19)

Season 7 (2019–20)

Season 8 (2021)

Broadcast
In Australia, the series airs on A&E.

In Netherlands, the series airs on RTL Z.

In Brazil, the series airs on History Channel and on Band.

In Portugal, the series airs on SIC Radical.

In Romania and later in Hungary, the series airs on Digi Life.

In New Zealand, the series airs on Bravo.

Controversies 
Will Yakowicz of Inc. described the show as embodying "the American faith in second chances and reinvention" in a 2018 article discussing the aftermaths of Lemonis's investments. Yakowicz, however, argued that the most successful businesses had already been in a healthy financial condition. Mr. Green Tea (from season one), for example, made $1.2 million in revenue the year before Lemonis invested in it. Other businessowners interviewed by Yakowicz alleged that Lemonis acted "more like a callous private equity investor than a small-business savior" and accused him of exploiting them for entertainment purposes. Inc. obtained a copy of the show's contract, which included the use of hidden cameras and warnings that the production company may "portray [a] company" that appears on the show "in a false light."

Multiple businessowners also filed lawsuits against Lemonis and the production company. These included Michael and Kathleen Ference, the owners of Big Fat Greek Gyro from season two. The Ferences alleged Lemonis never paid them the promised $350,000 in exchange for 55% of the business. During the episode, the restaurant was renamed to The Simple Greek. The Simple Greek, however, operated as a separate company controlled by Lemonis with no involvement from the Ferences. In a statement to Courthouse News Service, Lemonis described The Simple Greek as "a brand new concept that I created" and added that "I don't just create a concept and then just hand it over to people for doing nothing."

Nicholas Goureau and Stephanie Menkin, the owners of Courage.B (also from season two), filed a separate lawsuit against Lemonis. The pair alleged that Lemonis defrauded them and saddled their company with debt. Courage.B was folded into another company controlled exclusively by Lemonis. Over fifty businesses later joined Goureau and Menkin's lawsuit. Lemonis described the suit as "a grand shake down from people who are not entitled to anything."

Fans of the show also purportedly harassed businessowners who did not do a deal with Lemonis on social media. This harassment led to death threats in some instances.

See also
 Bar Rescue
 Shark Tank
 Kitchen Nightmares
 Nathan For You
 Secret Millionaire
 The Partner (TV series)

References

External links
 Official page
 The Profit on Internet Movie Database
 The Profit on TV.com
 The Profit Updates – Unaffiliated site that tracks the progress of businesses that have appeared on the show and whether Marcus Lemonis is still invested in them.

2010s American reality television series
2013 American television series debuts
2020s American reality television series
2021 American television series endings
CNBC original programming